Madamigella di Maupin is a 1966 Italian adventure film directed by Mauro Bolognini.  It is loosely based on the life of Mademoiselle de Maupin and the novel with the same name by Théophile Gautier.

Cast 
 Catherine Spaak as Magdeleine de Maupin
 Robert Hossein as Capitain Alcibiade 
 Tomas Milian as  Cavaliere d'Albert 
 Mikaela as  Rosetta Durand 
 Angel Alvarez as Monsieur de Maupin 
 Ottavia Piccolo as Princess Ninon 
 Manolo Zarzo as  The Sergeant

References

External links

 Le Chevalier de Maupin Filmographie Pathé

1965 films
1960s adventure films
Films directed by Mauro Bolognini
Films based on French novels
Films set in the 1690s
Films set in the 1700s
Films set in France
Italian swashbuckler films
1960s Italian-language films
1960s Italian films